Stephen II (died in 479) was a Patriarch of Antioch from 477 until his death.

Biography 
It is unknown when Stephen was born. He became a Patriarch in 477, and he was a successor of John II Codonatus, who held the see only three months and was exiled. Stephen was killed in 479 and was succeeded by Calendion.

He is venerated as a martyr saint on April 25.

References

Sources 
 

Patriarchs of Antioch
5th-century archbishops
5th-century Christian martyrs
Saints from Roman Syria
479 deaths